An Activin receptor is a receptor which binds activin.

Types include:
 Activin type 1 receptors
 Activin type 2 receptors

These proteins are receptor-type kinases of Ser/Thr type, which have a single transmembrane domain and a specific hydrophilic Cys-rich ligand-binding domain.

Human proteins containing this domain 
ACVR1;     ACVR1B;    ACVR1C;    ACVR2A;    ACVR2B;    ACVRL1;    BMPR1A;    BMPR1B;    
BMPR2;    TGFBR1;

References

External links
 

GS domain
TS domain
S/T domain
Single-pass transmembrane proteins